Cisy Nałęczów is a Polish football and volleyball club from Nałęczów.

The club is best known for its women's football team, that played four seasons in Poland's highest leagues, first the I Liga, then the Ekstraliga Kobiet. The women's section was founded in 2001 but came to an end in 2007 after the relegation from the Ekstraliga, after which the club's only interest are the men's teams.

The men's team plays in Poland's fifth tier league.

References

External links 

Women's football clubs in Poland
Puławy County
Football clubs in Lublin Voivodeship
Association football clubs established in 2001
2001 establishments in Poland